Dyre Vaa (19 January 1903 – 11 May 1980) was a Norwegian sculptor and painter.

Background
He was born in Kviteseid, Telemark, and later lived and worked in Rauland.  He was the son of  Tor Aanundsson Vaa (1864–1928) and Anne Marie Roholt (1866–1947).  Vaa grew up the youngest of five siblings in a wealthy home. His father was one of the largest forest owners in Telemark. He graduated artium at Kristiania Cathedral School in 1920. Vaa studied at the Norwegian National Academy of Craft and Art Industry and at Norwegian National Academy of Fine Arts from 1922–23, under Wilhelm Rasmussen, and later traveled to Spain, Greece and Italy for studies.

Career
In 1925, his first important work was a portrait of Minister of Education Ivar Peterson Tveiten (bronze. National Gallery of Norway).
In 1932, Vaa sculptures, paintings and drawings first appeared in Kunstnernes Hus. He served as chairman of the Norwegian Sculptor Association (Norsk Billedhuggerforening) from 1960-62. He continued to work until health problems from the mid-1970s.

Works
Among his works are his Ludvig Holberg sculpture outside Nationaltheatret in Oslo, on 1 September 1939. Further four bronze sculptures with motives from Norwegian fairy tales at Ankerbrua (Peer Gynt, Veslefrikk med fela, Kari Trestakk and Kvitebjørn Kong Valemon), and bronze wolves at Ila (1930). Vaa contributed to the decoration of Oslo City Hall, with the swan fountain in the courtyard (1948–1950). He has made portrayal sculptures of several writers, Henrik Ibsen (1958, Skien), Aasmund Olavsson Vinje (1968), Ivar Aasen, and Olav Aukrust (1955, Lom), the fiddle player Myllarguten (Arabygdi, Rauland), sculptural work at the Nidaros Cathedral in Trondheim, several World War II memorials (Rjukan 1946, Nordfjord 1947, Porsgrunn 1950, Gjerpen 1954), and is represented at the National Gallery of Norway.

Dyre Vaa Sculptural Art Collection
He gave a number of his works to Vinje municipality which formed the basis for the Dyre Vaa Sculptural Art Collection (Dyre Vaa-samlingane). The museum opened 1981  and is operating in conjunction with Vest-Telemark Museum.  On display are bronze sculptures and many of his gypsum figures, drawings and sketches.

Awards
Dyre Vaa was awarded the Schäffers legat (1924–25),  Aalls legat (1924),  Conrad Mohrs legat (1926) and  Houens legat (1929).  Vaa won the King's Medal of Merit in gold in 1951 and Nidaros Cathedral Gold Medal in 1969. He was made a Knight 1st Class in the Order of St. Olav  in 1969.

Personal life
He was the younger brother of lyricist Aslaug Vaa. The writer Tarjei Vesaas and composer Eivind Groven were his second cousins. In 1927, he married  Thora Lange Bojer (1902–1999) who  was daughter of writer Johan Bojer and was a frequent model in his work. They were the parents of six children. Their son Tor Vaa (1928-2008) was also a sculptor.

References

External links
Dyre Vaa-samlingane website

1903 births
1980 deaths
People from Kviteseid
People educated at Oslo Cathedral School
Oslo National Academy of the Arts alumni
Norwegian sculptors
20th-century Norwegian painters
20th-century sculptors
Recipients of the King's Medal of Merit in gold
Recipients of the St. Olav's Medal